Julian W. Hill (1904-1996)  was an American chemist who helped develop nylon.

Early life
Julian W. Hill was born in 1904, and he grew up in Warrenton, Missouri. He graduated from the School of Engineering & Applied Science at Washington University in St. Louis in 1924, where he earned a bachelor's degree in chemical engineering, and he went on to earn a PhD in organic chemistry from the Massachusetts Institute of Technology in 1928.

Career
Hill joined DuPont, where he worked as a chemist in the Experimental Station laboratories under Wallace H. Carothers's supervision. He initially studied polymers in the 1920s. By 1930, he had used a cold drawing method to produce a polyester. Hill's cold drawing method was used by Carothers in 1934 to develop the polyamide later named nylon, which was patented by DuPont and was a greater commercial success due to its higher melting point.

Hill was promoted to Assistant Director of the Chemical Department. He also served on DuPont's steering committee from 1932 to 1951. He became the Chair of DuPont's Committee on Educational Aid in 1951, and he helped fund academic programs in the United States until his retirement in 1964.

Personal life and death
Hill married Mary Louisa "Polly" Butcher, a Vassar College alumna, in 1931. They had two sons and a daughter. He suffered from poliomyelitis. He retired at the Cokesbury Village retirement village in Hockessin, Delaware with his wife, where he died on January 29, 1996.

References

1904 births
1996 deaths
People from St. Louis
McKelvey School of Engineering alumni
Massachusetts Institute of Technology School of Science alumni
20th-century American chemists
People with polio
DuPont people
People from Warrenton, Missouri
Chemists from Missouri